The Second tower of the Plaza de la Virgen Blanca, also called Tower of the Correría was the smaller of the two towers that noted for its height, the other (the higher) tower exist today intact, that were in the Plaza de la Virgen Blanca, in Vitoria-Gasteiz (Basque Country autonomous community, Spain).
Before 1650 this building was a city gate with a Gothic arc, after the 1650 reform had semicircular arches.

Remains

The San Miguel clock is now a distinctive element of the bell tower of the Church of San Miguel, this bell tower is seen in the foreground in the square.

See also
Portals of Vitoria-Gasteiz
Plaza de la Virgen Blanca
List of missing landmarks in Spain

References

External links
 A Youtube video with a 3D model. It is assumed that the tower is as it should be in the 19th century, not long before its demolition

Demolished buildings and structures in Spain
Vitoria-Gasteiz
Former towers
Bell towers in Spain
Former gates
City gates in Spain
Buildings and structures demolished in the 19th century